Stenocrepis elegans is a species of beetle in the family Carabidae. It is found in Mexico and southwestern United States.

References

Further reading

Harpalinae
Beetles of North America
Taxa named by John Lawrence LeConte